The 1937 Oregon State Beavers football team represented Oregon State University in the Pacific Coast Conference (PCC) during the 1937 college football season.  In their fifth season under head coach Lon Stiner, the Beavers compiled a 3–3–3 record (2–3–3 against PCC opponents), finished in sixth place in the PCC, and outscored their opponents, 69 to 60.  The team played its home games at Bell Field in Corvallis, Oregon.

Schedule

Roster
HB Joe Gray, Sr.

References

Oregon State
Oregon State Beavers football seasons
Oregon State Beavers football